Pancalia swetlanae is a Russian moth in the family Cosmopterigidae. It was first described by Sinev in 1985.

References

Natural History Museum Lepidoptera generic names catalog

Moths described in 1985
Antequerinae